Diana Bishop may refer to:

 Diana Bishop (rower) (born 1947), British Olympic rower
 Diana Bishop (actress), who featured in The Lord of the Rings (1981 radio series)
 Diana Bishop, the main character in the All Souls trilogy (A Discovery of Witches, Shadow of Night and The Book of Life), and in the TV series based on the novels.